Kentucky Kernels is a 1934 American comedy directed by George Stevens and starring the comedy duo of Bert Wheeler and Robert Woolsey.  The screenplay was written by Bert Kalmar, Harry Ruby, and Fred Guiol, from a story by Kalmar and Ruby.

Plot
The Great Elmer and Company, two out-of-work magicians, help lovelorn Jerry Bronson adopt Spanky Milford, to distract him. When Bronson makes up and elopes, the pair are stuck with the little boy. But Spanky inherits a Kentucky fortune, so they head south to Banesville, where the Milfords and Wakefields are conducting a bitter feud.

Cast
 Bert Wheeler as Willie Doyle
 Robert Woolsey as Elmer Dugan
 Mary Carlisle as Gloria Wakefield
 'Spanky' McFarland as Spanky
 Noah Beery as Colonel Wakefield
 Lucille LaVerne as Aunt Hannah Milford 
 Margaret Dumont as Mrs. Baxter
 Sleep 'n' Eat as Buckshot

References

1934 comedy films
1934 films
American comedy films
Films directed by George Stevens
Films set in Kentucky
American black-and-white films
RKO Pictures films
1930s American films